During the 1998–99 English football season, Charlton Athletic competed in the FA Premier League (known as the FA Carling Premiership for sponsorship reasons).

Season summary
Back in the top flight after an eight-year exile, Charlton Athletic made a good start to the Premiership campaign and Alan Curbishley was voted Manager of the Month for August. Their form soon dipped, but they were never completely outclassed by the rest of the Premiership sides. In the end, they were the last team to make the drop following a late revival by Southampton. But Curbishley's job was still safe, as the board had every confidence in his ability to regain a hard-earned place among the elite for the Addicks.

Key players in Charlton's ultimately unsuccessful bid to avoid relegation included Richard Rufus despite his being sent off in his first Premier League game against Newcastle United.

Final league table

Results summary

Results by round

Results
Charlton Athletic's score comes first

Legend

FA Premier League

FA Cup

League Cup

First-team squad
Squad at end of season

Left club during season

Reserve squad

Transfers

In

Out

Transfers in:  £5,400,000
Transfers out:  £260,000
Total spending:  £5,140,000

Statistics

Appearances, goals and cards
(Starting appearances + substitute appearances)

Starting 11
Considering starts in all competitions
 GK: #1,  Saša Ilić, 26
 RB: #2,  Danny Mills, 40
 CB: #5,  Richard Rufus, 31
 CB: #23,  Carl Tiler, 28
 LB: #3,  Chris Powell, 42
 RM: #4,  Neil Redfearn, 32
 CM: #8,  Mark Kinsella, 40
 CM: #15,  Keith Jones, 16 (#6,  Eddie Youds has 25 starts as a central defender)
 LM: #11,  John Robinson, 31
 CF: #9,  Andy Hunt, 35
 CF: #10,  Clive Mendonca, 22

Notes

References

Charlton Athletic F.C. seasons
Charlton Athletic